San Andres or San Andrés Formation may refer to:
 San Andres Formation, United States, a Permian geologic formations of the southwestern United States
 San Andrés Formation, Argentina, a Late Pliocene to Early Pleistocene geologic formation of Argentina
 San Andrés Formation, Colombia, a Miocene geologic formation of San Andrés Island, Colombia
 San Andrés Sandstone, a Paleogene geologic formation of Colombia